Madeleine Caudel (21 May 1879 in Paris – 27 January 1962 in Paris) was a French woman landscape painter. Madeleine Caudel was a member of the Société du Salon des Artistes Français.

She is not to be confused with painters Madeleine Caudel (1905–1993) and Mathilde Caudel-Didier. Biography 
In Paris, she lived at 17e, 75, street Nollet.

From about 1906 she exhibited at the Société du Salon des Artistes Français. From 1926 Madeleine Caudel exhibited at the Salon des Indépendants. Between 1929 and 1931 she exhibited at the Gallery Alexandre Lefranc, 15, street La Ville-l'Evêque (Paris) and Gallery Ecalle. In 1934, Caudel exhibited at the Mon Club'' together with Vera Rockline (1896-1934) and others.

References

Sources
 Le Radical, 1913/03/26 (A33), p.4, La Vie Municipale; Gallica BnF
 La Revue des beaux-arts, 1921/03 (SER4, N351)- (SER4, N352), p.8; Gallica BnF

External links 
 Works by Madeleine Caudel; artnet.com

1879 births
1962 deaths
20th-century French painters
Landscape artists
French still life painters
School of Paris
Post-impressionist painters
French women painters
20th-century French women artists